Pharnaceum is a genus of flowering plants in the family Molluginaceae, found in southern Africa. Some are annual or perennial herbs, others are shrubs or subshrubs.

Species
Currently accepted species include:

Pharnaceum albens L.f.
Pharnaceum alpinum Adamson
Pharnaceum aurantium (DC.) Druce
Pharnaceum brevicaule (DC.) Bartl.
Pharnaceum ciliare Adamson
Pharnaceum confertum (DC.) Eckl. & Zeyh.
Pharnaceum cordifolium L.
Pharnaceum croceum E.Mey. ex Fenzl
Pharnaceum detonsum Fenzl
Pharnaceum dichotomum L.f.
Pharnaceum elongatum (DC.) Adamson
Pharnaceum exiguum Adamson
Pharnaceum fluviale Eckl. & Zeyh.
Pharnaceum gracile Fenzl
Pharnaceum incanum L.
Pharnaceum lanatum Bartl.
Pharnaceum lanuginosum J.C.Manning & Goldblatt
Pharnaceum lineare L.f.
Pharnaceum microphyllum L.f.
Pharnaceum rubens Adamson
Pharnaceum serpyllifolium L.f.
Pharnaceum subtile E.Mey. ex Fenzl
Pharnaceum thunbergii Adamson
Pharnaceum trigonum Eckl. & Zeyh.
Pharnaceum viride Adamson

References

Molluginaceae
Caryophyllales genera